Ernst Benkard (27 February 1883 – 8 May 1946) was a German art historian and private lecturer.

Biography 
Born in Frankfurt, Benkard attended a grammar school, then studied art history and obtained his doctorate in 1907.

Among other things he worked as a correspondent and art critic for the Frankfurter Zeitung. From the winter semester 1927/28 to the winter semester 1937/38 he was employed at the  where he mainly offered classes on regional art as well as events on Italian Renaissance. He is said to have reported on the 1937 Große Deutsche Kunstausstellung  with "barely concealed irony, distance, and rejection." 

Benkard's works include an illustrated book on the death masks of statesmen and artists, which was published in Berlin in 1926 with a foreword by Georg Kolbe. It bears the title Das ewige Antlitz (The Eternal Face) and immediately triggered a dispute with   about a death mask of William Shakespeare. In Das ewige Antlitz Benkard also introduced L'Inconnue de la Seine, about which he poetically wrote that she is for us "a tender butterfly, which, carefreely elated, has fluttered and scorched its fine wings before time at the lamp of life".

Benkard died in Freiburg im Breisgau.

References

External links 
 Ernst Benkard on DNB
 Ernst Benkard on Goodreads
 Ernst Benkard: "Das ewige Antlitz - Eine Sammlung von Totenmasken", 1929 on Antiquitaeten-erfurt.de

1883 births
1946 deaths
Writers from Frankfurt
German art historians